West Bromwich bus station is a bus interchange in the town of West Bromwich in the West Midlands of England.

It is managed by Transport for West Midlands. Local bus services operated by various bus companies serve the bus station which has 24 departure stands. The West Bromwich Central tram stop on the West Midlands Metro is across the road from the bus station.

It opened in the spring of 2002 to replace the previous station, which had served the town for some 30 years, at a nearby location which was later developed as The Public arts centre.

The station features a mosaic artwork, Anamorphic Portico, by local sculptor Steve Field, which makes use of anamorphic columns and includes images loosely derived from David Christie Murray's book A Capful o’ Nails. An old Bundy clock is also displayed on the concourse.

References

External links

A map/plan of West Bromwich bus station, including a bus destination guide

Bus stations in the West Midlands (county)
Transport in Sandwell
Transport infrastructure completed in 2002
West Bromwich
2002 establishments in England